Cannock Chase is an area in Staffordshire, England. 

Cannock Chase may also refer to:

 Cannock Chase District
 Cannock Chase (UK Parliament constituency)
 "Cannock Chase", a song by Labi Siffre from his album Crying Laughing Loving Lying